Nebria uralensis is a species of black coloured ground beetle in the Nebriinae subfamily that can be found Russia and the Palearctic realm.

References

uralensis
Beetles described in 1901